"Nothing Could Come Between Us" is a song by Canadian hard rock group Theory of a Deadman. It was released in June 2002 as the lead single from their eponymous debut album.

It represented the first major success of the band and helped propel it into the music scene, reaching #2 in Canada and #8 on the US Billboard Mainstream Rock Tracks.

Content
The song lyrics deal with the disillusionment of a man that, despite his feelings, he does not feel like he can spend the rest of his life with someone. The song also involves him reminiscing about the good times they had and some of his favorite mannerisms of her ("Nothing could come between us, no nothing, nothing / One the favorite things she used to say").

Track listing
The Single Track Listing
 "Nothing Could Come Between Us"  (3:27)
 "Above This"                     (2:14)
 "Invisible Man"                  (2:42)
The Single CD included bonus track "Above This" and the song "Invisible Man". "Invisible Man" was included on the Theory of a Deadman album while "Above This" became a downloadable track.

Charts

Year-end charts

References

2002 debut singles
Theory of a Deadman songs
604 Records singles
2002 songs